Catherine Sampson is a British writer of crime/thriller fiction. Her first four novels were published by Pan Macmillan. She has also worked as a foreign correspondent for The Times and other publications.

Biography 

Sampson was born in 1962 in Swindon, England. She studied Chinese at Leeds University where she graduated with a BA in 1984. She then studied at Harvard University as a Kennedy Scholar. After working for the BBC in London she was assigned by The Times to Beijing in 1988. As the newspaper's China correspondent, Sampson covered the Tiananmen Square protests of 1989. She also worked as a freelance journalist during the handover of Hong Kong to China in 1997 before beginning her literary career in London. Since 2001 she has been based again in Beijing. Sampson's first novel, Falling Off Air, was published in 2004. She is married to James Miles, a foreign correspondent of The Economist.

Work 

The heroine of Sampson's early books was Robin Ballantyne, a British TV journalist working for "the Corporation" (possibly a veiled reference to the BBC, for which Sampson herself had once worked, and which was also her husband's employer during the 1980s and 90s). In Falling Off Air (2004), Ballantyne witnesses the death of a celebrity neighbour and gradually discovers how it mysteriously relates to her own professional and private world. In Out of Mind (2005), Ballantyne goes in search of a missing camerawoman, and becomes embroiled in "Corporation" intrigues. Ballantyne is less central to the action in Sampson's third novel, The Pool of Unease (2007), in which she shares the main role with Song Ren, a private detective. Both are trying to unravel the murder of a British man in Beijing. In the fourth novel, The Slaughter Pavilion (2008), Ballantyne is mentioned only briefly and Song becomes the protagonist. His investigations explore the gritty and lawless world of rural China.

Bibliography 

 Falling Off Air (2004) 
 Out of Mind (2005) 
 The Pool of Unease (2007) 
 The Slaughter Pavilion (2008) 
 Carnaby (2013) 
 Splintered Light (2014)

Other fiction 

Hit and Run in Beijing: Portrait of a City  (2008)

Notes

External links 
 Catherine Sampson website
 Catherine Sampson on writing fiction, Urbanatomy.com. October 2009
 Chinese government website attacks Catherine Sampson article, December 2008
 Catherine Sampson interviews author Qiu Xiaolong, March 2008.
 Catherine Sampson in conversation with Charlie Higson, James Twining, Joseph Finder and Simon Brett
 Catherine Sampson interviewed by fellow author Lijia Zhang on Blue Ocean Network, July 2010

Living people
1962 births
People from Swindon
English crime fiction writers
British thriller writers
British women novelists
Alumni of the University of Leeds
British reporters and correspondents
The Times people
21st-century British novelists
21st-century British women writers
Women thriller writers
Harvard University alumni
Kennedy Scholarships